Members Only, Vol. 3 is the second mixtape by American hip hop group Members Only. It was released via SoundCloud on June 26, 2017. It is the final Members Only project to be released during XXXTentacion's lifetime.

Featured artists
The album features many artists from the Members Only group, such as Ski Mask the Slump God, Wifisfuneral, Bass Santana, Robb Banks, Craig Xen, and more.

Last project
This was the final Members Only project released in XXXTentacion's lifetime, as he was murdered on June 18, 2018, in Deerfield Beach, Florida, six months before the release of Members Only, Vol. 4.

The project's original outro "DisDaHateSongBby :/" is a track from Wifisfuneral's mixtape Boy Who Cried Wolf, and was not originally released with this mixtape.

Track listing

Charts

References

XXXTentacion albums
Members Only (hip hop collective) albums
2017 compilation albums
Hip hop compilation albums
Sequel albums
Empire Distribution albums